Dahir is the name of a settlement in Fujairah.

Wadi al-Lahbah is nearby which has two pools that are of interest for their regional heritage species.  In particular, there are several species of dragonfly and damselfly of interest including Ischnura evansi, Anax imperator, Orthetrum ransonnetii, and Trithemis arteriosa.

References

Populated places in the Emirate of Fujairah